Each team's roster consisted of at least 15 skaters (forwards and defencemen) and two goaltenders, and at most 25 skaters and three goaltenders. All 16 participating nations, through the confirmation of their respective national associations, have to submit a roster by the first IIHF directorate meeting.

Age and team as of 13 May 2022.

Group A

Canada
The roster was announced on 9 May 2022.

Head coach: Claude Julien

Denmark
A 26-player roster was announced on 3 May 2022.

Head coach: Heinz Ehlers

France
A 27-player roster was announced on 4 May 2022. The final squad was revealed on 9 May 2022.

Head coach: Philippe Bozon

Germany
A 28-player roster was announced on 5 May 2022. The final squad was revealed on 9 May 2022.

Head coach: Toni Söderholm

Italy
A 28-player roster was announced on 4 May 2022. The final squad was revealed on 11 May 2022.

Head coach: Greg Ireland

Kazakhstan
A 32-player roster was announced on 2 May 2022. The final squad was revealed on 11 May 2022.

Head coach: Yuri Mikhailis

Slovakia
A 27-player roster was announced on 7 May 2022. The final squad was revealed on 9 May 2022.

Head coach: Craig Ramsay

Switzerland
A 26-player roster was announced on 6 May 2022. It was reduced to 22 on 9 May 2022.

Head coach: Patrick Fischer

Group B

Austria
The roster was announced on 9 May 2022.

Head coach: Roger Bader

Czechia
The roster was announced on 7 May 2022.

Head coach: Kari Jalonen

Finland
A 26-player roster was announced on 8 May 2022.

Head coach: Jukka Jalonen

Great Britain
The roster was announced on 22 April 2022.

Head coach: Peter Russell

Latvia
A 26-player roster was announced on 29 April 2022.

Head coach: Harijs Vītoliņš

Norway
The roster was announced on 11 May 2022.

Head coach: Petter Thoresen

Sweden
The roster was announced on 11 May 2022.

Head coach: Johan Garpenlöv

United States
A 24-player roster was announced on 5 May 2022.

Head coach: David Quinn

References

Rosters
IIHF World Championship rosters